Río Sonora (Sonora River) is a 402-kilometer-long river of Mexico. It lies on the Pacific slope of the Mexican state of Sonora and it runs into the Gulf of California.

Watershed
Slopes range from steep orientations in the upper part of the watershed to more gradual topographies in the valleys. The Sonora River watershed is subdivided into six smaller watersheds.

Ecology
Biotic communities found within the watershed in order of importance by the area covered are the Sinaloan thornscrub, the plains of Sonora subdivision, semidesert grasslands, the Madrean evergreen woodland, and the central gulf coast subdivision.

Physician naturalist Edgar Alexander Mearns' 1907 report of beaver (Castor canadensis) on the Sonora River may be the southernmost extent of the range of this North American aquatic mammal.

See also
List of longest rivers of Mexico

References

External links
  Sonora
 
 

Rivers of the Gulf of California
Rivers of Sonora
rivers of Mexico